Qataniaria is an extinct plant genus which existed in what is now Israel during the Albian period. It was described by Valentin Krassilov and Eckart Schrank in 2011, and the type species is Qataniaria noae.

References

Prehistoric plant genera
Fossil taxa described in 2011